355 AD/CE (CCCLV) is a year in the Gregorian calendar.

355 may also refer to:

The year 355 BC
355 (number), a number in the 300s range

Places
355 Gabriella, a main belt asteroid, the 355th asteroid registered
355P/LINEAR–NEAT, a periodic comet, the 355th periodic comet registered
Hill 355, Korea; where the Korean War Battle of Hill 355 took place
Route 355, see List of highways numbered 355
+355, the country calling code for telephone numbers in Albania

People and characters
Agent 355, a secret agent during the American Revolutionary War
Agent 355 (Y: The Last Man), a character in the comic book series Y: The Last Man

Other uses
355th (disambiguation), military units numbered 355
The 355, a 2022 American spy film
Cadillac Series 355, a 1930s car
Ferrari F355, an Italian sportscar
IBM 355, a computer magnetic disc hard drive

See also

 Battle of Hill 355, in the Korean War
 
 35 (disambiguation)